This is a list of political offices which have been held by a woman, with details of the first woman holder of each office. It is ordered by country, by dates of appointment. Former countries, such as Yugoslavia, are also listed.

Africa

Asia

Europe

North America

Oceania

South America

International organizations

African Union

 President of the Pan-African Parliament - Gertrude Mongella - 2004 (at its founding)
 Vice President of the Pan-African Parliament - Elise Loum - 2004
 Chairperson of the African Union Commission - Nkosazana Dlamini-Zuma - 2012

European Union

President of the European Parliament – Simone Veil – 1979
 President-in-Office of the European Council – Margaret Thatcher – 1981
 European Commissioner – Christiane Scrivener / Vasso Papandreou – 1989
 Leader of the Socialist Group and of any major party – Pauline Green – 1994
 Co Vice-President of the European Commission – Loyola de Palacio – 1999
 First Vice-President of the European Commission – Margot Wallström – 2004
 High Representative of the Union for Foreign Affairs and Security Policy – Catherine Ashton – 2009
President of the European Commission – Ursula von der Leyen – 2019.

League of Nations

 Substitute Delegate and Ambassador to the League of Nations – Elena Văcărescu – 1922
 Permanent Delegate and Ambassador to the League of Nations – Elena Văcărescu – 1924

United Nations

 Head of the section of Welfare Policy – Alva Myrdal – 1949
 Chairman of UNESCO's social science section  – Alva Myrdal – 1950
 President of the United Nations General Assembly – Vijaya Lakshmi Pandit – 1953
 Permanent Representative – Agda Rössel (Permanent Representative of Sweden to the United Nations) – 1958
 Head of the United Nations Children's Fund – Carol Bellamy – 1995
 United Nations High Commissioner for Human Rights – Mary Robinson – 1997
 Deputy Secretary-General – Louise Fréchette – 1998
 Executive Director of the United Nations Human Settlements Programme – Anna Tibaijuka – 2000
 Under-Secretary-General – Inga-Britt Ahlenius – 2005
Assistant-Secretary-General  – Helvi Sipilä  – 1972
 President of the International Court of Justice – Rosalyn Higgins – 2006
 Administrator of the United Nations Development Programme – Helen Clark – 2009
 Managing Director of the International Monetary Fund – Christine Lagarde – 2011

See also

Council of Women World Leaders
List of elected and appointed female heads of state and government
List of the first LGBT holders of political offices
List of the first women heads of government and state in Muslim-majority countries
Muslim women political leaders
Women in government

References

Feminism-related lists